Clarence Robert Semmel (30 April 1910 – 7 February 2000) was an Australian rules footballer who played with North Melbourne in the Victorian Football League (VFL).

Notes

External links 

1910 births
2000 deaths
Australian rules footballers from Victoria (Australia)
North Melbourne Football Club players
Williamstown Football Club players